Świnobród may refer to the following places in Poland:
Świnobród, Lower Silesian Voivodeship (south-west Poland)
Świnobród, Podlaskie Voivodeship (north-east Poland)